Mary Douglas Leakey, FBA (née Nicol, 6 February 1913 – 9 December 1996) was a British paleoanthropologist who discovered the first fossilised Proconsul skull, an extinct ape which is now believed to be ancestral to humans.  She also discovered the robust Zinjanthropus skull at Olduvai Gorge in Tanzania, eastern Africa. For much of her career she worked with her husband, Louis Leakey, at Olduvai Gorge, where they uncovered fossils of ancient hominines and the earliest hominins, as well as the stone tools produced by the latter group. Mary Leakey developed a system for classifying the stone tools found at Olduvai.  She discovered the Laetoli footprints, and at the Laetoli site she discovered hominin fossils that were more than 3.75 million years old.

During her career, Leakey discovered fifteen new species of animal. She also brought about the naming of a new genus.

In 1972, after the death of her husband, Leakey became director of excavations at Olduvai.  She maintained the Leakey family tradition of palaeoanthropology by training her son, Richard, in the field.

Biography

Childhood
Mary Leakey was born on 6 February 1913, in London, England to Erskine Edward Nicol and Cecilia Marion (Frere) Nicol. The Nicol family moved to numerous locations in thе United States, Italy, and Egypt where Erskine painted watercolours that he brought back and sold in England. Mary began to develop an enthusiasm for Egyptology during these travel.

On her mother's side, Mary was a 3rd great-granddaughter of antiquarian John Frere and shared this same ancestry with  historian and archaeologist Sheppard Frere. The Frere family had been active abolitionists in the British colonial empire during the 19th century and established several communities for freed slaves. Three of these communities were still in existence when Leakey published her 1984 autobiography: Freretown, Kenya; Freretown, South Africa; and Freretown, India.

The Nicols spent much of their time in southern France where young Mary became fluent in French. In 1925, when Mary was 12, the Nicols stayed at the commune, Les Eyzies, at a time when Elie Peyrony, a French archaeologist and prehistorian, was excavating one of the caves there. Peyrony was not excavating scientifically during that early stage of archaeology and did not understand the significance of much of what he found. Mary received permission to go through the remnants of his dig and this was where her interests in prehistory and archaeology were sparked. She started a collection of points, scrapers, and blades from the dump and developed her first system of classification.

The family then moved to Cabrerets, a village of Lot, France. There she met Abbé Lemozi, the village priest, who befriended her and became her mentor for a time. The two toured Pech Merle cave to view the prehistoric paintings of bison and horses.

Education
In the spring of 1926, when Mary was thirteen years old, her father died of cancer and Mary and her mother returned to London. Mary was placed in a local Catholic convent to be educated, and she later boasted of never passing an examination there. Although she spoke fluent French, Mary did not excel at French language studies, apparently because her teacher frowned upon her provincial accent. She was expelled for refusing to recite poetry, and was later expelled from a second convent school for causing an explosion in a chemistry laboratory. After the second expulsion, her mother hired two tutors, who were no more successful than the nuns. After the unsuccessful tutors, her mother hired a nanny.

Mary's particular interests centered on illustration and archaeology, but formal university admission was impossible with her academic record. Her mother contacted a professor at Oxford University about possible admission, and was encouraged not to apply, as it would be a waste of her time. Mary had no further contact with the university until it awarded her an honorary doctoral degree in 1951.

The small family moved to Kensington, in West London, where, though unregistered, Mary attended lectures in archaeology and related subjects at University College and at the London Museum, where she studied under Mortimer Wheeler.

Mary applied to work on a number of summer excavations. Wheeler was the first to accept her for a dig. It took place at St. Albans at the Roman site of Verulamium. Her next dig was at Hembury, a Neolithic site, under Dorothy Liddell, who trained her for four years until 1934. Her illustrations of tools for Liddell drew the attention of Gertrude Caton Thompson, and, in late 1932, she entered the field as an illustrator for Caton Thompson's book The Desert Fayoum.

Life

Through Caton Thompson, an English archaeologist, Mary met Louis Leakey, who was in need of an illustrator for his book Adam's Ancestors (1934).  While she was doing that work they became romantically involved. Leakey was still married and his son Collin had just been born when they moved in with each other. They married after Frida Leakey divorced him in 1936. This ruined his career at Cambridge University.

Mary and Louis Leakey had three sons: Jonathan, born in 1940, Richard in 1944, and Philip in 1949. Their fourth child, a daughter, died as a baby. The three boys received much of their early childhood care at various anthropological sites and, whenever possible, the Leakeys excavated and explored as a family. The children accompanied them to various work sites, with dig becoming a family endeavour.  The boys grew up with the same love of freedom that their parents had become accustomed to.  Mary would not even allow guests to shoo away the pet hyraxes that helped themselves to food and drink at the dinner table.  In her autobiography, she rarely mentioned her pregnancies or the difficulties she faced while raising children in Kenya. She smoked a lot, first cigarettes and then cigars, and usually dressed as though completing an excavation.

While her husband was alive, they published many joint findings. However, her contributions were often credited to her husband. Louis Leakey died on 1 October 1972 of a heart attack. Mary Leakey continued with the family's archaeological work, becoming a respected figure in paleoanthropology of her own right. Her son, Richard Leakey, also decided to become a paleoanthropologist, and Mary helped him begin his career. Her two sons, Jonathan and Philip Leakey, pursued other interests.

Death
Mary Leakey died on 9 December 1996, in Nairobi, Kenya, at the age of 83. Her family, who announced her death, did not give the cause, saying only that she died peacefully.

Research

Mary Leakey served her apprenticeship under Dorothy Liddell at Hembury, 1930–34 (see above). In 1934, she took part in a dig at Swanscombe where she discovered the largest elephant tooth known to Britain at that time.

Throughout the 1930s to 1950s, Mary and Louis Leakey worked at Later Stone Age, Neolithic, and Iron Age archaeological sites in central Kenya, such as Hyrax Hill and Njoro River Cave. In October 1948, Mary discovered a Proconsul africanus skull on Rusinga Island. Mary Leakey also recorded and published the Kondoa Irangi Rock Paintings in central Tanzania.

The Leakeys' most famous research, however, was at Olduvai Gorge in the Serengeti plains of northern Tanzania. The site yielded many stone tools, from Oldowan choppers to multi-purpose hand axes. The earliest tools they dug up were likely made by Homo habilis and can be dated to over two million years ago.

On the morning of 17 July 1959, Louis felt ill at Olduvai and stayed at camp while Mary went out to the field. At some point she noticed a piece of bone that "seemed to be part of a skull" with a "hominid" look". After dusting the topsoil away, she found "two large teeth set in the curve of a jaw", and she drove back to camp exclaiming "I've got him!" Active excavation began the following day and a partial cranium was unearthed within a few weeks, though it had to be reconstructed from fragments scattered in the scree. After examining the cranium, Louis Leakey concluded it was of a species ancestral to humans, the australopithecines.
He eventually dubbed the find Zinjanthropus boisei, "East Africa man"—Zinj is an ancient Arabic word for the East African coast. The name was later revised to Paranthropus boisei, and by some to Australopithecus boisei;  a consensus on its classification is still in debate.

In the 1960s the Leakeys started to work with the young Kamoya Kimeu with Mary particularly valuing his expertise. The family trained him in paleontology, evolutionary theory and excavating techniques, which he then trained the next generations of Kenyan fossil finders in, as he became a highly respected Kenyan paleontologist and curator.

After her husband died in 1972, Mary Leakey continued their work at Olduvai and Laetoli. It was at the Laetoli site that she discovered hominin fossils that were more than 3.75 million years old.

From 1976 to 1981, Leakey and her staff uncovered the Laetoli hominin footprint trail which had been tracked through a layer of volcanic ash some 3.6 million years ago. The subsequent years were filled with research at Olduvai and Laetoli, follow-up work to discoveries, and preparing publications.

Throughout her career, Leakey discovered 15 new species of animals, and one new genus. She was elected a Foreign Honorary Member of the American Academy of Arts and Sciences in 1979.

Legacy
In April 2013, Leakey was honoured by Royal Mail in the UK, as one of six people selected as subjects for the "Great Britons" commemorative postage stamp issue. Google celebrated the 100th anniversary of Mary Leakey's birth with its Google doodle for 6 February 2013.

The Mary Leakey Girls' High School, a secondary school for girls near Kikuyu Town, was named after Mary's mother-in-law, Mary Bazett Leakey, mother of her husband, Louis Leakey.

In the video game Civilization VI, Leakey is a Great Scientist that players can recruit. Her unique ability grants extra science and tourism to artifacts.

Awards and honours
Honorary D.Sc., University of the Witwatersrand, 1968
Honorary DSSc, Yale, 1976
Honorary D.Sc., University of Michigan, 1980
Honorary D.Litt., Oxford, 1981
Gold Medal of Society of Woman Geographers, 1975
Linnaeus Gold Medal of the Royal Swedish Academy, 1978
The Elizabeth Blackwell Award, 1980
The Hubbard Medal of National Geographic Society, 1962 – jointly with Louis Leakey
The Prestwich Medal, Geological Society of London, 1969 – jointly with Louis Leakey

Books authored
Excavations at Njoro River Cave (with Louis Leakey), 1950
Olduvai Gorge: Excavations in Beds I and II, 1960–1963, 1971
Olduvai Gorge: My Search for Early Man, 1979
Africa's Vanishing Art: The Rock Paintings of Tanzania, 1983
Disclosing the Past, 1984

See also
 List of fossil sites
 List of human evolution fossils (with images)

Notes

Further reading

External links
Leakey Foundation website

1913 births
1996 deaths
20th-century anthropologists
20th-century archaeologists
20th-century American women scientists
20th-century British women writers
British anthropologists
British archaeologists
British women anthropologists
British women archaeologists
British women scientists
Fellows of the American Academy of Arts and Sciences
Fellows of the British Academy
Foreign associates of the National Academy of Sciences
Kenyan people of British descent
Mary
Members of the Society of Woman Geographers
Paleoanthropologists
Scientists from London
Women paleontologists
Members of the Royal Swedish Academy of Sciences